Kouch Sokumpheak (born 15 February 1987) is a Cambodian footballer who plays for Nagaworld in the Cambodian Premier League and the Cambodia national team. He plays as a midfielder.

International career

International goals
Scores and results list Cambodia's goal tally first.

Honors

Club
Khemara Keila
Hun Sen Cup: 2007
2006 AFC President's Cup: Semi final
Phnom Penh Crown
Cambodian League: 2011, 2014
2011 AFC President's Cup: Runner up

Individual
Hun Sen Cup Golden Boot: 2007,2009,2010

References

1987 births
Living people
Cambodian footballers
Cambodia international footballers
People from Kampong Thom province
Association football forwards
Phnom Penh Crown FC players
Nagaworld FC players